Martina Navratilova and Heinz Günthardt were the defending champions but only Navratilova competed that year with Peter Fleming.

Navratilova and Fleming lost in the final 6–4, 6–4 against Raffaella Reggi and Sergio Casal.

Seeds
Champion seeds are indicated in bold text while text in italics indicates the round in which those seeds were eliminated.

Draw

Final

Top half

Bottom half

References
1986 US Open – Doubles draws and results at the International Tennis Federation

Mixed Doubles
US Open (tennis) by year – Mixed doubles